The Aetolian League was a short-lived football league in the south east of England. It was established in 1959 after the Kent League folded, leaving a number of clubs without a league to play in. Seven of the founder members were from the Kent League and four from the London League. The league had two divisions, although Division Two consisted mainly of the reserve teams of clubs in Division One; Medway Corinthians and Orpington Athletic were the only two clubs to field a first team in Division Two; Medway joined in 1959 and left in 1961, with Orpington joining in 1960 and remaining until the league folded. As a result of Division Two being largely reserve teams, there was no promotion or relegation between the two divisions.

In 1964 after only five seasons of existence, it merged with the London League to form the Greater London League. This later merged with the Metropolitan League to form the Metropolitan–London League, which in turn merged with the Spartan League and later the South Midlands League to form the modern Spartan South Midlands League.

History

1959–60
Fourteen clubs joined the league for its first season:
Seven from the defunct Kent League (Deal Town, Faversham Town, Chatham Town, Snowdown Colliery Welfare, Herne Bay, Sheppey United and Whitstable Town)
Four from the London League (Cheshunt, Cray Wanderers, Eton Manor and Willesden)
One from the Kent Amateur League (Crockenhill)
One new club, Ford United (a merger of Briggs Motor Bodies and Ford Sports)
Charlton Athletic 'A'

1960–61
Ford United won the League Cup in the 1960–61 season.

1961–62
One new club, Beckenham Town from the London League, joined the league for the 1961–62 season.

1962–63
One new club, East Ham United from the London League, joined the league for the 1962–63 season.

1963–64
Whistable Town rejoined the league for the 1963–64 season. At the end of the season most clubs joined the newly formed Greater London League.

References

 
Football leagues in Kent
Football competitions in London
Defunct football leagues in England